White Marsh Brewing Company, LLC is a brewery founded in 1996 by founders Bill Blocher and Tony Meoli.  The company is a member of the Brewers Association of Maryland.

Distribution
White Marsh Brewing Company owns and operates Red Brick Station, a restaurant located on The Avenue in White Marsh, Maryland, which is the primary outlet for its beers.  All beer sold at Red Brick Station is brewed by the parent company.

The company lost its primary distributor in early 2008, when Old Dominion was sold to Coastal Brewing.

The beers
The following beers are served year round:

 Avenue Ale / Ale
 Honeygo Lite / Lite Ale
 Daily Crisis IPA / India Pale Ale
 Something Red / Amber Ale
 Spooners Stout / Stout

White Marsh Brewing Company also offers seasonal bears at their Red Brick Station location that vary throughout the year.  These include:

 Big Gunpowder Pale Ale
 Highlander Heavy
 Blueberry Ale

References

Beer brewing companies based in Maryland
White Marsh, Maryland